Nature Unleashed: Earthquake, or simply known as Earthquake, is a 2005 American-British-Canadian-Lithuanian direct-to-video disaster film that is directed by Tibor Takács and written by Andy Hurst. It stars Fintan McKeown, Jacinta Mulcahy, and Michael Zelniker.

The film focuses on an 8.2.-magnitude earthquake destroying a Russian nuclear power plant called the Kasursk Nuclear Power Plant, triggering a nuclear meltdown.

Summary
The people arrives at the Russian Nuclear Power Plant called the Kasursk Nuclear Power Plant. When an 8.2-magnitude earthquake of all time rips through Europe, it levels Russia and sends shockwaves through the lives of Russian people who live there. An earthquake destroys a Russian Nuclear Power Plant, triggering  a nuclear meltdown and people in Russia need to survive.
The cinematics of the film rely on other films scenes to hash out the story. Most notably, scenes of collapsing buildings and highways from the 1997 film Dante's Peak.

Cast
 Fintan McKeown as Josh
 Jacinta Mulcahy as Rachel
 Michael Zelniker as Viktor
 Zoe Thorne as Cherie
 Damian Hunt  as Dylan
 Patrick Monckton as Emilio

Release

Home media releases
In the United States, the film was released on DVD by Echo Bridge Home Entertainment on September 13, 2005.

On September 9, 2009, the film was re-released on DVD by Echo Bridge Home Entertainment, as part of  a double feature with the another disaster film, Nature Unleashed: Avalanche.

Television broadcast
The film was premiered on the cable television channel Sci-Fi Channel in the United States in November 2006.

Philippines ( Tagalog Dubbed ) 
Tagalog dubbed of Nature Unleashed: Earthquake was released on GTV (Philippine TV network) (sister channel of GMA 7) (Philippines) since 2021 premiere from Siesta Fiesta Movies on GTV at 12nn. Also on I Heart Movies distributes airing on Block Screening at 6pm premiere, and 2pm replay.

See also
 Atomic Twister - similar disaster film about a tornado damaging a nuclear power plant

References

External links
 
 
 

2000s English-language films
2000s German-language films
Lithuanian-language films
2000s Russian-language films
2005 films
2005 direct-to-video films
2000s disaster films
2000s thriller films
Films set in Russia
British direct-to-video films
British disaster films
Canadian direct-to-video films
Canadian disaster films
English-language Canadian films
English-language Lithuanian films
Films about earthquakes
Films about nuclear accidents and incidents
Nu Image films
2005 multilingual films
British multilingual films
Canadian multilingual films
Lithuanian multilingual films
Films directed by Tibor Takács
2000s Canadian films
2000s British films